All Saints Catholic Church is a complex of historic church buildings on N. Perry Street in New Riegel, Ohio

Description and history
The complex consists of four buildings St. Boniface Church, St. Boniface Rectory, St. Boniface School and the Monastery of Contemplative Sisters, Convent of the Sister of the Precious Blood. Other buildings on the property include a small chapel in the cemetery and several more recent structures. It was added to the National Register on November 17, 1982 as, "St. Boniface Roman Catholic Church, School, Rectory, and Convent of the Sister of the Precious Blood". The records of the church were microfilmed by the Bowling Green State University Center for Archival Collections in 2001.

See also
 Historic preservation
 Catholic Church
 Saint Boniface

Photo gallery

References

External links
 
 

Churches in the Roman Catholic Diocese of Toledo
Churches on the National Register of Historic Places in Ohio
Romanesque Revival church buildings in Ohio
Gothic Revival church buildings in Ohio
Buildings and structures in Seneca County, Ohio
National Register of Historic Places in Seneca County, Ohio